Marc Serramitja Taberner (born 4 August 1990) is a Spanish professional footballer who plays for Palamós CF as an attacking midfielder.

Club career
Born in La Cellera de Ter, Girona, Catalonia, Serramitja started playing with Girona FC, making professional debut on 20 June 2009, in a 1–3 home defeat against SD Huesca. A month later, he joined CF Gavà in a season-long loan deal.

In July 2010, Serramitja was loaned to Alicante CF. A season later, he joined CF Badalona, again on loan. In July 2012, Serramitja joined UE Llagostera. On 30 January 2013, he left Llagostera and joined UE Sant Andreu in a six-month loan deal.

Serramitja subsequently returned to the albirrojos, and was released. On 31 January 2014 he moved abroad for the first time in his career, signing a two-year deal with Kristiansund BK. Serramitja made his debut on 1 May, coming on as a late substitute in a 3–3 draw at Strømmen IF. On 18 June, however, he was released by mutual consent.

On 29 July 2014 Serramitja moved to UE Figueres. After a trial period with American club Columbus Crew SC during July 2016, he signed for Palamós CF on 9 August of that year.

References

External links

1990 births
Living people
Spanish footballers
Footballers from Catalonia
Association football midfielders
Segunda División players
Segunda División B players
Tercera División players
Girona FC players
CF Gavà players
Alicante CF footballers
CF Badalona players
UE Costa Brava players
UE Sant Andreu footballers
UE Figueres footballers
Palamós CF footballers
Kristiansund BK players
Spanish expatriate footballers
Spanish expatriate sportspeople in Norway
Expatriate footballers in Norway
CE Constància players